Michele Mignani (born 30 April 1972)  is an Italian professional football manager and former defender. He is the manager of Serie B club Bari.

Playing career
Mignani made his Serie A debut on 13 January 1991, against U.S. Lecce. He then went on to spend 10 seasons with Siena, being the team captain during the club's first Serie A campaign and one of the mainstays for the Tuscans. He left in 2006, and his #4 jersey number was retired by Siena as a homage.

Coaching career
He retired in 2009 to return to Siena as a youth coach, originally for the Allievi Nazionali and since 2010 for the main youth team, the Primavera under-19 squad.

He then served as head coach of Olbia for the club's 2016–17 Lega Pro campaign, being relieved of his managerial duties on 5 March 2017 following a string of six consecutive losses.

On 25 November 2019 he was hired by Serie C club Modena.

After two seasons in charge of Modena, Mignani left to join Serie C fallen giants Bari, which he successfully guided to win the title and subsequent return to Serie B.

Managerial statistics

Honours

Managerial
 Bari
 Serie C: 2021–22 (Group C)

References

External links
Profile at La Gazzetta dello Sport 
National Stats at FIGC 

Italian footballers
Italy under-21 international footballers
U.C. Sampdoria players
S.P.A.L. players
A.C. Monza players
U.S. Pistoiese 1921 players
S.S.D. Lucchese 1905 players
A.C.N. Siena 1904 players
A.S.D. Castel di Sangro Calcio players
U.S. Triestina Calcio 1918 players
F.C. Grosseto S.S.D. players
Serie A players
Serie B players
Association football defenders
Footballers from Genoa
Living people
1972 births
Italian football managers
Modena F.C. managers
Serie C managers